Christopher Dalton Johnson (born October 1, 1984) is an American professional baseball coach and former player who is the assistant hitting coach for the Chicago White Sox of Major League Baseball (MLB). He played in MLB for the Houston Astros, Arizona Diamondbacks, Atlanta Braves, Cleveland Indians, and Miami Marlins.

Amateur career
Johnson was drafted in the 37th round by the Boston Red Sox in the 2003 Major League Baseball Draft, but he opted for college. He attended Stetson University, where he led the Hatters to the 2005 and 2006 Atlantic Sun Tournament Championships.  In 2005, he was named the A-Sun Freshman of the Year, and played collegiate summer baseball for the Hyannis Mets of the Cape Cod Baseball League. Johnson was drafted by the Houston Astros in the fourth round of the 2006 Major League Baseball Draft.

Professional career

Houston Astros
Johnson was called up to the majors for the first time on September 7, 2009 and made his major league debut two days later.

In the 2010 season, Johnson batted .308 with 105 hits, 22 doubles, 11 home runs, and 52 RBIs in just 341 at bats.

Arizona Diamondbacks
Johnson was traded to the Arizona Diamondbacks on July 29, 2012, for Bobby Borchering and Marc Krauss. In his first game as a Diamondback, Johnson hit a grand slam. He became the first Diamondback player to hit a grand slam in his first game with the club.

After qualifying as a Super Two, giving him an extra year of arbitration eligibility, Johnson signed a one-year, $2.2875 million deal with the Diamondbacks for the 2013 season.

Atlanta Braves

After the 2012 season, the Diamondbacks traded Johnson and Justin Upton to the Atlanta Braves in exchange for Martín Prado, Randall Delgado, Nick Ahmed, Zeke Spruill and Brandon Drury. He enjoyed a breakout season, hitting .321, with 12 home runs and 68 RBIs. In the NL batting race, Johnson finished second to Michael Cuddyer.

Johnson signed a three-year extension worth $23.5 million on May 2, 2014. The deal included a team option worth $10 million. He regressed in 2014, while attempting to hit for more power. Johnson set a career high in strikeouts, and his walk rate fell.

After continuing to decline in 2015, Johnson lost his starting role to Juan Uribe, who the Braves acquired from the Los Angeles Dodgers during the season. Johnson was pushed into a reserve role, often starting only against left handed pitchers. After Freddie Freeman suffered a wrist injury, Johnson occasionally started at first base, but still saw less playing time than in past seasons. Johnson expressed an interest in being traded at the trade deadline, in the hope of getting more playing time with another team. However, it was Uribe who was traded near the deadline. In addition, Freeman returned from the disabled list and Johnson was expected to regain his starting role at third base.

Cleveland Indians
On August 7, 2015, Johnson was traded to the Cleveland Indians in exchange for Nick Swisher, Michael Bourn, and cash considerations. Johnson appeared in 27 games with the Indians, batting .289 with four doubles, one home run, and seven RBIs. 

On December 22, 2015, the Indians released him.

Miami Marlins
On January 13, 2016, Johnson signed a one-year contract with the Miami Marlins.

Baltimore Orioles
On February 13, 2017, Johnson signed a minor league contract with the Baltimore Orioles, that included an invitation to major league spring training. He was released on March 27 but re-signed a couple of days later. He elected free agency on November 6, 2017.

Chicago White Sox
On January 24, 2019, Johnson signed a minor league contract with the Chicago White Sox. He was released on March 20, 2019.

Coaching career

Chicago White Sox
Johnson was hired as the hitting coach for the Charlotte Knights, the Triple-A affiliate of the Chicago White Sox, before the 2021 season.

On November 29, 2022, Johnson was named assistant hitting coach for the White Sox. This would be his first coaching position in the Major League level.

Personal life
Johnson is the son of former MLB player and coach Ron Johnson.

See also

List of second-generation Major League Baseball players

References

External links

1984 births
Living people
Sportspeople from Naples, Florida
Baseball players from Florida
Major League Baseball third basemen
Houston Astros players
Arizona Diamondbacks players
Atlanta Braves players
Cleveland Indians players
Miami Marlins players
Florida Atlantic Owls baseball players
Stetson Hatters baseball players
Hyannis Harbor Hawks players
Tri-City ValleyCats players
Lexington Legends players
Salem Avalanche players
North Shore Honu players
Corpus Christi Hooks players
Round Rock Express players
Scottsdale Scorpions players
Lancaster JetHawks players
Indios de Mayagüez players
Oklahoma City RedHawks players
Gwinnett Braves players
Akron RubberDucks players
Norfolk Tides players
Aberdeen IronBirds players